En Vazhi Thani Vazhi is a 2015 Indian Tamil-language action thriller film directed by Shaji Kailas, starring R. K., Poonam Kaur, supported by Meenakshi Dixit, Radha Ravi and Ashish Vidyarthi. The film is the remake of Bollywood film Ab Tak Chhappan.

Plot
En Vazhi Thani Vazhi is the story of a police officer who takes on a corrupt system and criminals.

Cast

R. K. as ACP Vetriselvan
Poonam Kaur as Sarasu
Meenakshi Dixit as Inspector Priya
Radha Ravi as Isaac Devaraj
Visu as Judge
Ashish Vidyarthi as ACP Vanarajan
Rajiv Krishna as Danveer
Seetha as Vetriselvan's mother
Roja as Renuka Devi
Thambi Ramaiah
Ilavarasu
Singamuthu as Kallapandi
Thalaivasal Vijay as Manimaaran
Gnanavel as MP
Sangili Murugan
Mohan Sharma as Commissioner
Sampath Raj
Raj Kapoor
T. P. Gajendran
Ajay Rathnam as Police inspector
K. Prabhakaran as Politician
 Bava Lakshmanan as Paramasivam
Madhan Bob as Doctor
Karate Raja as City Babu
Besant Ravi as Chinna
Arulmani
Ponnambalam as Vavval Kumar
Mohan V. Ram as Advocate
Karunanithi
Bayilvan Ranganathan
Sumathi as lady on the street
Vazhakku En Muthuraman as Public prosecutor

Production
After the moderate success of their previous collaboration Ellam Avan Seyal (2008), Shaji Kailas and RK announced their second collaboration in 2011 with the project titled Kadamai Kanniyam Kattupaadu named after a 1985 film of the same name produced by Kamal Haasan. Vivek was selected to perform comedy portions though he was later replaced by Thambi Ramaiah. However, the film was further delayed and remained unreleased. The film was then resurfaced under the title Eepeeko but later changed as En Vazhi Thani Vazhi named after the dialogue spoken by Rajinikanth for Padayappa (1999). RK said: "It's the story of a police officer who deals with the criminals in his own way. Hence we felt the title was very relevant t the story. It does add some weightage because it's a popular dialogue, but eventually it's the film that matters".

Soundtrack
The soundtrack was composed by Srikanth Deva, while the lyrics for the songs were written by Vairamuthu and Ilayakamban. The audio was launched on 16 December 2014 by actor Vijay at RKV studios.

Release
The film was released on 6 March 2015 with 10 other Tamil films. M. Suganth of The Times of India gave the film a rating of one out of five stars and said that "En Vazhi Thani Vazhi is that kind of film but by the time it ends, all that we feel is murderous rage — for it not only manages to sink below the bar but digs a pit, and keeps going deeper and deeper into the ground".

References

External links
 

2015 films
Indian action thriller films
2015 masala films
Fictional portrayals of the Tamil Nadu Police
Tamil remakes of Hindi films
2010s Tamil-language films
Films scored by Srikanth Deva
2015 action thriller films
Films directed by Shaji Kailas